Anti-intellectualism is hostility to and mistrust of intellect, intellectuals, and intellectualism, commonly expressed as deprecation of education and philosophy and the dismissal of art, literature, and science as impractical, politically motivated, and even contemptible human pursuits. Anti-intellectuals present themselves and are perceived as champions of common folk—populists against political and academic elitism—and tend to see educated people as a status class that dominates political discourse and higher education while being detached from the concerns of ordinary people.

Totalitarian governments manipulate and apply anti-intellectualism to repress political dissent. During the Spanish Civil War (1936–1939) and the following dictatorship (1939–1975) of General Francisco Franco, the reactionary repression of the White Terror (1936–1945) was notably anti-intellectual, with most of the 200,000 civilians killed being the Spanish intelligentsia, the politically active teachers and academics, artists and writers of the deposed Second Spanish Republic (1931–1939). During the Cambodian Genocide (1975–1979) the Communist regime of Cambodia nearly destroyed its entire educated population.

Ideological anti-intellectualism 

In the 20th century, societies systematically removed intellectuals from power, to expediently end public political dissent. During the Cold War (1945–1991), the Czechoslovak Socialist Republic (1948–1990) ostracized the philosopher Václav Havel as a politically unreliable man unworthy of ordinary Czechs' trust; the post-communist Velvet Revolution (17 November – 29 December 1989) elected Havel president for ten years. Ideologically-extreme dictatorships who mean to recreate a society such as the Khmer Rouge rule of Cambodia (1975–1979) pre-emptively killed potential political opponents, especially the educated middle-class and the intelligentsia. To realize the Year Zero of Cambodian history, Khmer Rouge social engineering restructured the economy by de-industrialization and assassinated non-communist Cambodians suspected of "involvement in free-market activities" such as the urban professionals of society (physicians, attorneys, engineers, et al.) and people with political connections to foreign governments. The doctrine of Pol Pot identified the farmers as the true proletariat of Cambodia and the true representatives of the working class entitled to hold government power, hence the anti-intellectual purges.

In 1966, the anti-communist Argentine military dictatorship of General Juan Carlos Onganía (1966–1970) intervened at the University of Buenos Aires with the Night of the Long Batons to physically dislodge politically dangerous academics from five university faculties. That expulsion to the exile of the academic intelligentsia became a national brain drain upon the society and economy of Argentina. In opposition to the military repression of free speech, biochemist César Milstein said ironically: "Our country would be put in order, as soon as all the intellectuals who were meddling in the region were expelled."

Academic anti-intellectualism 

In The Campus War (1971), the philosopher John Searle said,

In Social Sciences as Sorcery (1972), the sociologist Stanislav Andreski advised laymen to distrust the intellectuals' appeals to authority when they make questionable claims about resolving the problems of their society: "Do not be impressed by the imprint of a famous publishing house, or the volume of an author's publications. ... Remember that the publishers want to keep the printing presses busy, and do not object to nonsense if it can be sold."

In Science and Relativism: Some Key Controversies in the Philosophy of Science (1990), philosopher of science and epistemologist Larry Laudan said that the prevailing type of philosophy taught at universities in the U.S. (Postmodernism and Poststructuralism) is anti-intellectual, because "the displacement of the idea that facts and evidence matter, by the idea that everything boils down to subjective interests and perspectives is—second only to American political campaigns—the most prominent and pernicious manifestation of anti-intellectualism in our time."

Distrust of intellectuals 
In the U.S., the American conservative economist Thomas Sowell argued for distinctions between unreasonable and reasonable wariness of intellectuals in their influence upon the institutions of a society. In defining intellectuals as "people whose occupations deal primarily with ideas", they are different from people whose work is the practical application of ideas. That cause for layman mistrust lies in the intellectuals' incompetence outside their fields of expertise. Although having great working knowledge in their specialist fields, when compared to other professions and occupations, the intellectuals of society face little discouragement against speaking authoritatively beyond their field of formal expertise, and thus are unlikely to face responsibility for the social and practical consequences of their errors. Hence, a physician is judged competent by the effective treatment of the sickness of a patient, yet might face a medical malpractice lawsuit should the treatment harm the patient. In contrast, a tenured university professor is unlikely to be judged competent or incompetent by the effectiveness of his or her intellectualism (ideas), and thus not face responsibility for the social and practical consequences of the implementation of the ideas.

In the book Intellectuals and Society (2009), Sowell said:

By encouraging, or even requiring, students to take stands where they have neither the knowledge nor the intellectual training to seriously examine complex issues, teachers promote the expression of unsubstantiated opinions, the venting of uninformed emotions, and the habit of acting on those opinions and emotions, while ignoring or dismissing opposing views, without having either the intellectual equipment or the personal experience to weigh one view against another in any serious way.

Hence, school teachers are part of the intelligentsia who recruit children in elementary school and teach them politics—to advocate for or to advocate against public policy—as part of community-service projects; which political experience later assists them in earning admission to a university. In that manner, the intellectuals of a society intervene and participate in social arenas of which they might not possess expert knowledge, and so unduly influence the formulation and realization of public policy. In the event, teaching political advocacy in elementary school encourages students to formulate opinions "without any intellectual training or prior knowledge of those issues, making constraints against falsity few or non-existent."

In Britain, the anti-intellectualism of the writer Paul Johnson derived from his close examination of twentieth-century history, which revealed to him that intellectuals have continually championed disastrous public policies for social welfare and public education, and warned the layman public to "beware [the] intellectuals. Not merely should they be kept well away from the levers of power, they should also be objects of suspicion when they seek to offer collective advice." In that vein, "In the Land of the Rococo Marxists" (2000), the American writer Tom Wolfe characterized the intellectual as "a person knowledgeable in one field, who speaks out only in others."
In 2000, British publisher Imprint Academic published Dumbing Down, a compilation of essays edited by Ivo Mosley, grandson of the British fascist Oswald Mosley, which included essays on a perceived widespread anti-intellectualism by Jaron Lanier, Ravi Shankar, Robert Brustein, Michael Oakshott among others.

In the United States

17th century 

In The Powring Out of the Seven Vials (1642), the Puritan John Cotton demonized intellectual men and women by saying that "the more learned and witty you bee, the more fit to act for Satan will you bee. ... Take off the fond doting ... upon the learning of the Jesuits, and the glorie of the Episcopacy, and the brave estates of the Prelates. I say bee not deceived by these pompes, empty shewes, and faire representations of goodly condition before the eyes of flesh and blood, bee not taken with the applause of these persons". Yet, not every Puritan concurred with Cotton's religious contempt for secular education, such as John Harvard who founded the university which now bears his name.

In The Quest for Cosmic Justice (2001), the economist Thomas Sowell said that anti-intellectualism in the U.S. began in the early Colonial era, as an understandable wariness of the educated upper classes, because the country mostly was built by people who had fled political and religious persecution by the social system of the educated upper classes. Moreover, there were few intellectuals who possessed the practical hands-on skills required to survive in the New World of North America, which absence from society led to a deep-rooted, populist suspicion of men and women who specialize in "verbal virtuosity", rather than tangible, measurable products and services:

From its colonial beginnings, American society was a "decapitated" society—largely lacking the top-most social layers of European society. The highest elites and the titled aristocracies had little reason to risk their lives crossing the Atlantic, and then face the perils of pioneering. Most of the white population of colonial America arrived as indentured servants and the black population as slaves. Later waves of immigrants were disproportionately peasants and proletarians, even when they came from Western Europe ... The rise of American society to pre-eminence, as an economic, political, and military power, was thus the triumph of the common man, and a slap across the face to the presumptions of the arrogant, whether an elite of blood or books.

19th century 
In U.S. history, the advocacy and acceptability of anti-intellectualism has varied, in part because the majority of Americans lived a rural life of arduous manual labor and agricultural work prior to the industrialization of the late nineteenth century. Therefore, an academic education in the Greco–Roman classics was largely perceived as of impractical value and the bookish scholar deemed an unprofitable occupation. Yet, Americans of the nineteenth century were a generally literate people who read Shakespeare for intellectual pleasure and the Christian Bible for emotional succor; thus, the ideal American Man was a literate and technically-skilled man who was successful in his trade, ergo a productive member of society. Culturally, the ideal American was the self-made man whose knowledge derived from life-experience, not an intellectual man whose knowledge of the real world was derived from books, formal education, and academic study; thus, the justified anti-intellectualism reported in The New Purchase, or Seven and a Half Years in the Far West (1843), the Rev. Bayard R. Hall, A.M., said about frontier Indiana:

We always preferred an ignorant, bad man to a talented one, and, hence, attempts were usually made to ruin the moral character of a smart candidate; since, unhappily, smartness and wickedness were supposed to be generally coupled, and [like-wise] incompetence and goodness.

Yet,  the "real-life" redemption of the egghead American intellectual was possible if he embraced the mores and values of  mainstream society; thus, in the fiction of O. Henry, a character notes that once an East Coast university graduate "gets over" his intellectual vanity he no longer thinks himself better than other men, realizing he makes just as good a cowboy as any other young man, despite his common-man counterpart being the slow-witted naïf of good heart, a pop culture stereotype from stage shows.

20th–21st centuries 

In 1912, the New Jersey governor, Woodrow Wilson, described the battle:

What I fear is a government of experts. God forbid that, in a democratic country, we should resign the task and give the government over to experts. What are we for if we are to be scientifically taken care of by a small number of gentlemen who are the only men who understand the job?

In Anti-intellectualism in American Life (1963) the historian Richard Hofstadter said that anti-intellectualism is a social-class response, by the middle-class "mob", against the privileges of the political elites. As the middle class developed political power, they exercised their belief that the ideal candidate to office was the "self-made man", not the well-educated man born to wealth. The self-made man, from the middle class, could be trusted to act in the best interest of his fellow citizens. As evidence of this view, Hofstadter cited the derision of Adlai Stevenson as an "egghead". In Americans and Chinese: Passages to Differences (1980), Francis Hsu said that American egalitarianism is stronger in the U.S. than in Europe, e.g. in England,

English individualism developed hand in hand with legal equality. American self-reliance, on the other hand, has been inseparable from an insistence upon economic and social as well as political equality. The result is that a qualified individualism, with a qualified equality, has prevailed in England, but what has been considered the inalienable right of every American is unrestricted self-reliance and, at least ideally, unrestricted equality. The English, therefore, tend to respect class-based distinctions in birth, wealth, status, manners, and speech, while Americans resent them.

Such social resentment characterises contemporary political discussions about the socio-political functions of mass-communication media and science; that is, scientific facts, generally accepted by educated people throughout the world, are misrepresented as opinions in the U.S., specifically about climate science and global warming.

Miami University anthropology professor Homayun Sidky has argued that 21st-century anti-scientific and pseudoscientific approaches to knowledge, particularly in the United States, are rooted in a postmodernist "decades-long academic assault on science:" "Many of those indoctrinated in postmodern anti-science went on to become conservative political and religious leaders, policymakers, journalists, journal editors, judges, lawyers, and members of city councils and school boards. Sadly, they forgot the lofty ideals of their teachers, except that science is bogus."

In 2017, a Pew Research Center poll revealed that a majority of American Republicans thought colleges and universities have a negative impact on the United States, and in 2019, academics Adam Waters and E.J. Dionne stated that U.S. President Donald Trump "campaigned for the presidency and continues to govern as a man who is anti-intellectual, as well as anti-fact and anti-truth." In 2020, Trump signed an executive order banning anti-racism bias trainings from offices of federal agencies, grant programs, and federal contractors  as part of a larger strategy to combat a perceived progressive academic bias, like emphases on the political legacy of American slavery, with "patriotic education" instead.

Education and knowledge 
The U.S. ranks at middling quality of education compared to other countries, and Americans often lack basic knowledge and skills. Various surveys have found, among other things: that 77% of American public school students cannot identify George Washington as the first President of the United States; that around 1 in 5 Americans believe that the Sun revolves around Earth; and that about 50% of American high school graduates are unprepared for college-level reading. John Traphagan of the University of Texas attributes this to a culture of anti-intellectualism, noting that nerds and other intellectuals are often stigmatized in American schools and popular culture. At universities, student anti-intellectualism has resulted in the social acceptability of cheating on schoolwork, especially in the business schools, a manifestation of ethically expedient cognitive dissonance rather than of academic critical thinking.

The American Council on Science and Health said that denialism of the facts of climate science and of climate change misrepresents verifiable data and information as political opinion. Anti-intellectualism puts scientists in the public view and forces them to align with either a liberal or a conservative political stance. Moreover, 53% of Republican U.S. Representatives and 74% of Republican Senators deny the scientific facts of the causes of climate change.

In the rural U.S., anti-intellectualism is an essential feature of the religious culture of Christian fundamentalism. Mainline Protestant churches and the Roman Catholic Church have directly published their collective support for political action to counter climate change, whereas Southern Baptists and Evangelicals have denounced belief in both evolution and climate change as a sin, and have dismissed scientists as intellectuals attempting to create "Neo-nature paganism". People of fundamentalist religious belief tend to report not seeing evidence of global warming.

Corporate mass media 
The reportage of corporate mass-communications media appealed to societal anti-intellectualism by misrepresenting university life in the U.S., where the students' pursuit of book learning (intellectualism) was secondary to the after-school social life. That the reactionary ideology communicated in mass-media reportage misrepresented the liberal political activism and social protest of students as frivolous, social activities thematically unrelated to the academic curriculum, which is the purpose of attending university. In Anti-intellectualism in American Media (2004), Dane Claussen identified the contemporary anti-intellectualist bent of manufactured consent that is inherent to commodified information:

The effects of mass media on attitudes toward intellect are certainly multiple and ambiguous. On the one hand, mass communications greatly expand the sheer volume of information available for public consumption. On the other hand, much of this information comes pre-interpreted for easy digestion and laden with hidden assumption, saving consumers the work of having to interpret it for themselves. Commodified information naturally tends to reflect the assumptions and interests of those who produce it, and its producers are not driven entirely by a passion to promote critical reflection.

The editorial perspective of the corporate mass-media misrepresented intellectualism as a profession that is separate and apart from the jobs and occupations of regular folk. In presenting academically successful students as social failures, an undesirable social status for the average young man and young woman, corporate media established to the U.S. mainstream their opinion that the intellectualism of book-learning is a form of mental deviancy, thus, most people would shun intellectuals as friends, lest they risk social ridicule and ostracism. Hence, the popular acceptance of anti-intellectualism lead to populist rejection of the intelligentsia for resolving the problems of society. Moreover, in the book Inventing the Egghead: The Battle over Brainpower in American Culture (2013), Aaron Lecklider indicated that the contemporary ideological dismissal of the intelligentsia derived from the corporate media's reactionary misrepresentations of intellectual men and women as lacking the common-sense of regular folk.

In Europe

Communism 
In the first decade after the Russian Revolution of 1917, the Bolsheviks suspected the Tsarist intelligentsia as having the potential to betray the proletariat. Thus, the initial Soviet government consisted of men and women without much formal education. Moreover, the deposed propertied classes were termed Lishentsy ("the disenfranchised"), whose children were excluded from education. Eventually, some 200 Tsarist intellectuals such as writers, philosophers, scientists and engineers were deported to Germany on philosophers' ships in 1922 while others were deported to Latvia and Turkey in 1923.

During the revolutionary period, the pragmatic Bolsheviks employed "bourgeois experts" to manage the economy, industry, and agriculture and so learn from them. After the Russian Civil War (1917–1922), to achieve socialism the Soviet Union (1922–91) emphasized literacy and education in service to modernizing the country via an educated working class intelligentsia rather than an Ivory Tower intelligentsia. During the 1930s and 1950s, Joseph Stalin replaced Vladimir Lenin's intelligentsia with an intelligentsia that was loyal to him and believed in a specifically Soviet world view, thereby producing the pseudoscientific theories of Lysenkoism and Japhetic theory.

In October 1937, there was a mass extermination of Belarusian writers, artists and statespeople by the Soviet Union occupying authorities. This event marked the peak of the Great Purge and repressions of Belarusians in the Soviet-controlled area of eastern Belarus. More than 100 notable persons were executed, most of them on the night of 2930 October 1937. Their innocence was later admitted by the Soviet Union after Joseph Stalin's death.

At the beginning of World War II, the Soviet secret police carried out mass executions of the Polish intelligentsia and military leadership in the 1940 Katyn massacre.

Fascism 

The idealist philosopher Giovanni Gentile established the intellectual basis of Fascist ideology with the autoctisi (self-realisation) that distinguished between the good (active) intellectual and the bad (passive) intellectual:

To counter the "passive intellectual" who used his or her intellect abstractly, and was therefore "decadent", he proposed the "concrete thinking" of the active intellectual who applied intellect as praxis—a "man of action", like the Fascist Benito Mussolini, versus the decadent Communist intellectual Antonio Gramsci. The passive intellectual stagnates intellect by objectifying ideas, thus establishing them as objects. Hence the Fascist rejection of materialist logic, because it relies upon a priori principles improperly counter-changed with a posteriori ones that are irrelevant to the matter-in-hand in deciding whether or not to act.

In the praxis of Gentile's concrete thinking criteria, such consideration of the a priori toward the properly a posteriori constitutes impractical, decadent intellectualism. Moreover, this fascist philosophy occurred parallel to Actual Idealism, his philosophic system; he opposed intellectualism for its being disconnected from the active intelligence that gets things done, i.e. thought is killed when its constituent parts are labelled, and thus rendered as discrete entities.

Related to this, is the confrontation between the Spanish franquist General, Millán Astray, and the writer Miguel de Unamuno during the Dia de la Raza celebration at the University of Salamanca, in 1936, during the Spanish Civil War. The General exclaimed: ¡Muera la inteligencia! ¡Viva la Muerte! ("Death to the intelligentsia! Long live death!"); the Falangists applauded.

In Asia

China

Imperial China 
Qin Shi Huang (246–210 BC), the first Emperor of unified China, consolidated political thought, and power, by suppressing freedom of speech at the suggestion of Chancellor Li Si, who justified such anti-intellectualism by accusing the intelligentsia of falsely praising the emperor, and dissenting through libel. From 213 to 206 BC, it was generally thought that the works of the Hundred Schools of Thought were incinerated, especially the Shi Jing (Classic of Poetry, c. 1000 BC) and the Shujing (Classic of History, c. 6th century BC). The exceptions were books by Qin historians, and books of Legalism, an early type of totalitarianism—and the Chancellor's philosophic school (see the Burning of books and burying of scholars). However, upon further inspection of Chinese historical annals such as the Shi Ji and the Han Shu, this was found not to be the case. The Qin Empire privately kept one copy of each of these books in the Imperial Library but it publicly ordered that the books should be banned. Those who owned copies were ordered to surrender the books to be burned; those who refused were executed. This eventually led to the loss of most ancient works of literature and philosophy when Xiang Yu burned down the Qin palace in 208 BC.

People's Republic of China 

The Cultural Revolution (1966–1976) was a politically violent decade which saw wide-ranging social engineering throughout the People's Republic of China by its leader Chairman Mao Zedong. After several national policy crises during which he was motivated by his desire to regain public prestige and control of the Chinese government, Mao announced on 16 May 1966 that the Chinese Communist Party (CCP) and Chinese society were permeated with liberal bourgeois elements who meant to restore capitalism to China and he also announced that people could only be removed after a post–revolutionary class struggle was waged against them. To that effect, China's youth nationally organized themselves into Red Guards and hunted the "liberal bourgeois" elements who were supposedly subverting the CCP and Chinese society. The Red Guards acted nationally, purging the country, the military, urban workers and the leaders of the CCP. The Red Guards were particularly aggressive when they attacked their teachers and professors, causing most schools and universities to be shut down once the Cultural Revolution began. Three years later in 1969, Mao declared that the Cultural Revolution was ended, yet the political intrigues continued until 1976, concluding with the arrest of the Gang of Four, the de facto end of the Cultural Revolution.

Democratic Kampuchea 

When the Communist Party of Kampuchea and the Khmer Rouge (1951–1981) established their regime as Democratic Kampuchea (1975–1979) in Cambodia, their anti-intellectualism which idealised the country and demonised the cities was immediately imposed on the country in order to establish agrarian socialism, thus, they emptied cities in order to purge the Khmer nation of every traitor, enemy of the state and intellectual, often symbolised by eyeglasses.

Ottoman Empire 

In the early stages of the Armenian genocide of 1915, around 2,300 Armenian intellectuals were deported from Constantinople (Istanbul) and most of them were subsequently murdered by the Ottoman government. The event has been described by historians as a decapitation strike, the purpose of which was intended to deprive the Armenian population of an intellectual leadership and a chance to resist.

See also

Footnotes

Further reading 
 
 Liza Featherstone, Doug Henwood, and Christian Parenti, "'Action Will be Taken': Left Anti-Intellectualism and its Discontents," Left Business Observer.
 William Hinton, Hundred Day War: The Cultural Revolution at Tsinghua University. New York: New York University Press, 1972.
 Richard Hofstadter, Anti-intellectualism in American Life. New York: Alfred A. Knopf, 1963.
 Susan Jacoby, The Age of American Unreason. New York: Pantheon Books, 2008.

External links

 

 
Academia
Social theories
Persecution of intellectuals